Air Chief Marshal Sir Alasdair McKay Sinclair Steedman,  (29 January 1922 – 2 January 1992) was a senior commander in the Royal Air Force.

RAF career
Steedman joined the Royal Air Force in 1942 and served as a pilot during the Second World War. He was appointed Officer Commanding No. 39 Squadron in 1948 and Officer Commanding No. 8 Squadron in 1949. He went on to be Station Commander at Royal Ceylon Air Force Base Katanayake in 1957 and after a tour on the Directing Staff at the Joint Services Staff College from 1960 he became Station Commander at RAF Lyneham in 1962. From 1965 to 1967 he was Chief of the Air Staff of the Royal Malaysian Air Force. He was made Director of Defence Plans (Air) in 1967, Director of the Defence Operations Staff in 1968 and Assistant Chief of the Air Staff (Policy) in 1969. He went on to be Senior Air Staff Officer at Headquarters RAF Strike Command in 1971, Commandant of the RAF Staff College, Bracknell, in 1972 and Air Member for Supply and Organisation in 1976. In October 1977, on promotion to air chief marshal, Steedman took up his last appointment as the UK Military Representative to NATO.

Retirement and later life
After retiring in 1981, Steedman took up position as the Controller of the RAF Benevolent Fund until 1988. He was also Chairman of the Royal International Air Tattoo between 1981 and 1988.

References

|-
 

|-

|-

1922 births
1992 deaths
Commanders of the Order of the British Empire
Knights Grand Cross of the Order of the Bath
Recipients of the Distinguished Flying Cross (United Kingdom)
Recipients of the Commendation for Valuable Service in the Air
Fellows of the Royal Aeronautical Society
Commanders of the Order of Polonia Restituta
Royal Air Force air marshals
Royal Air Force personnel of World War II
Royal Malaysian Air Force personnel